Theofan Stilian Noli, known as Fan Noli (6 January 1882 – 13 March 1965), was an Albanian writer, scholar, diplomat, politician, historian, orator, Archbishop, Metropolitan and founder of the Albanian Orthodox Church and the Albanian Orthodox Archdiocese in America who served as Prime Minister and regent of Albania in 1924 during the June Revolution.

Fan Noli is venerated in Albania as a champion of literature, history, theology, diplomacy, journalism, music, national unity and ecumenism. He played an important role in the consolidation of Albanian as the national language of Albania with numerous translations of world literature masterpieces. He also wrote extensively in English: as a scholar and author of a series of publications on Skanderbeg, Shakespeare, Beethoven, religious texts and translations. He produced a translation of the New Testament in English, The New Testament of our Lord and Savior Jesus Christ from the approved Greek text of the Church of Constantinople and the Church of Greece, published in 1961.

Noli earned degrees at Harvard (1912), the New England Conservatory of Music (1938), and finally his Ph.D. from Boston University (1945). He was ordained a priest in 1908, establishing thereby the Albanian Church and elevating the Albanian language to ecclesiastic use. He briefly resided in Albania after the 1912 declaration of independence. After World War I, Noli led the diplomatic efforts for the reunification of Albania and received the support of US President Woodrow Wilson. Later he pursued a diplomatic-political career in Albania, successfully leading the Albanian bid for membership in the League of Nations.

A respected figure who remained critical of corruption and injustice in the Albanian government, Fan Noli was asked to lead the 1924 June Revolution. He then served as prime minister until his revolutionary government was overthrown by Ahmet Zogu. He was exiled to Italy and permanently settled in the United States in the 1930s, acquiring US citizenship and agreeing to end his political involvement. He spent the rest of his life as an academician, religious leader, and writer.

Background
Fan Noli was born Theofanis Stylianos Mavromatis 1882 in İbriktepe, a small village situated in the Thracian Ottoman Vilayet of Adrianople originally settled by Albanians from Qyteza, in the County of Korçë and known to the townspeople as such at the time. He was an Albanian of the Eastern Orthodox faith. Noli was a descendant of these Orthodox Christian Albanian settlers who fled what is today southern Albania and resettled in Thrace in areas that had been depopulated due to regional conflicts. During his youth, Noli received his education from Greek elementary and secondary schools.  As a young man, Noli wandered throughout the Mediterranean Basin, living in Athens in Greece, Alexandria in Egypt and Odessa in Russia, and supported himself as an actor and translator. As well as his native Albanian, he spoke many languages such as Greek, English, French, Turkish, and Arabic. Having been a teacher in Athens, Noli went abroad to Egypt in 1903 and worked as a teacher in Greek schools of Alexandria using the name Theofanis Mavromatis and did not espouse Albanian national sentiments. Later in his work as a teacher and in Egyptian theater Noli embraced Albanian national sentiments. Through his contacts with the Albanian expatriate movement, he became an ardent supporter of his country's nationalist movement and moved to the United States in 1906. He first worked in Buffalo, New York, in a lumber mill and then moved to Boston, Massachusetts, and worked as an operator on a machine which stamped labels on cans. The Young Turks (CUP) had a hostile view of Albanian leaders such as Fan Noli who were doing political activities with the assistance of outside powers.

Hudson Incident

The earliest Orthodox Christian Albanian immigrants to Boston were communicants of the Greek Orthodox Church, the leadership of which was vehemently opposed to the Albanian nationalist cause. When Kristaq Dishnica, a young factory worker who had died of influenza, was refused burial on the grounds that, as an Orthodox Christian who identified as an Albanian, he was therefore automatically excommunicated from the Greek Orthodox Church, Fan Noli and a group of Albanian émigrés in New England set about laying the groundwork for an independent, autocephalous Albanian Orthodox Church. The event, which came to be known as the Hudson Incident, was a seminal moment in the establishment of an independent Albanian Orthodox Christian religious consciousness. Noli, the new church's first clergyman, was ordained as a priest in 1908 by Archbishop Platon (Rozhdestvensky) of the Russian Church in the United States. By achieving Patriarchal recognition for the autocephaly of the Albanian Orthodox Church and the full translation of the Orthodox liturgy from the original Greek text into Tosk Albanian, Noli aimed to peacefully neutralize and dismantle the ideological platform of Greek irredentism promoted by reactionaries within the Orthodox Church in Albania and to defend the right of Orthodox Christian Albanians to coexist with their Greek neighbors in a secular Republic immune to the sectarian Megali Idea. Noli was a staunch supporter of Albanian patriotic unity and a separation of religion from the state and moreover, considered it important for religious office to be held by clergy fluent in Albanian and possessing Albanian citizenship.

Political and Religious activities

In 1908, Noli began studying at Harvard, completing his Bachelor of Arts degree in 1912. During April 1912 Vatra (Hearth) an Albanian American diaspora organisation was founded with Noli and Faik Konica serving as its leaders and advocating for Albanian sociopolitical self determination with the Ottoman Empire. He returned to Europe to promote Albanian independence, setting foot in Albania for the first time in 1913. Noli returned to the United States during World War I, serving as head of the Vatra organization, which effectively made him leader of the Albanian diaspora. His diplomatic efforts in the United States and Geneva won the support of President Woodrow Wilson for an independent Albania and, in 1920, earned the new national membership in the fledgling League of Nations. Though Albania had already declared its independence in 1912, membership in the League of Nations provided the country with the international recognition it had failed to obtain until then.

In 1921, Noli entered the Albanian Parliament as a representative of the liberal pro-British "People's Party", the chief liberal movement in the country. The other parties were the conservative pro-Italian "Progressive Party" founded by Mehdi Frashëri and led by Ahmet Zogu, and "Popular Party" of Xhafer Ypi. The conservatives of Zogu would dominate the political scene. A Congress of Berat in 1922 was convened to formally lay the foundations of an Albanian Orthodox Church which consecrated Fan Noli as Bishop of Korçë and primate of all Albania while the establishment of the church was seen as important for maintaining Albanian national unity.

Noli served briefly as Foreign Minister in the government of Xhafer Ypi. This was a period of intense turmoil in the country between the liberals and the conservatives. After a botched assassination attempt against Zogu, the conservatives revenged themselves by assassinating another popular liberal politician, Avni Rustemi. Noli's speech at Rustemi's funeral was so powerful that liberal supporters rose up against Zogu and forced him to flee to Yugoslavia (March 1924). Zogu was succeeded briefly by his father-in-law, Shefqet Vërlaci, and by the liberal politician Iliaz Vrioni; Noli was named prime minister and regent on 17 July 1924.

Downfall and exile

Despite his efforts to reform the country, Noli's "Twenty Point Program" was unpopular, and his government was overthrown by groups loyal to Zogu on Christmas Eve of that year.   Two weeks later, Zogu returned to Albania, and Noli fled to Italy under sentence of death.

Conscious of his fragile position, Zogu took drastic measures to consolidate his return to power. By the end of winter, two of the main leaders of the opposition, Bajram Curri and Luigj Gurakuqi, were assassinated, while others were imprisoned. 

Noli founded the "National 
Committee" also known as KONARE in Vienna. The committee published the periodical called "National Freedom". Some of the early Albanian communists as Halim Xhelo or Riza Cerova would start their publishing activities here. The committee aimed in overthrowing Zogu and his cast and restoring democracy. Despite the efforts, the committee's access and influence in Albania would be limited. With the intervention of Kosta Boshnjaku, an old communist and KONARE member, the organization would receive unconditioned monetary support from the Comintern. Also Noli and Boshnjaku would make possible for exile members of the Committee for the National Defence of Kosovo (outlawed by Zogu) to get the same financial support.
 
In 1928, KONARE changed its name to "Committee of National Liberation". Meanwhile, in Albania, after three years of republican regime, the "National Council" declared Albania a Constitutional Monarchy, and Ahmet Zogu became king.
Noli moved back to the United States in 1932 and formed a republican opposition to Zogu, who had since proclaimed himself "King Zog I". Over the next years, he continued his education, studying and later teaching Byzantine music, and continued developing and promoting the autocephalous Albanian Orthodox Church he had helped to found. While in exile, he briefly allied with King Zog, who fled Albania before the invading Italians in 1939, but was unable to set a firm anti-Axis, anti-Communist front.

After the war, Noli established some ties with the communist government of Enver Hoxha, which seized power in 1944. He unsuccessfully urged the U.S. government to recognize the regime, but Hoxha's increasing persecution of all religions prevented Noli's church from maintaining ties with the Orthodox hierarchy in Albania. Despite the Hoxha regime's anticlerical bent, Noli's ardent Albanian nationalism brought the bishop to the attention of the U.S. Federal Bureau of Investigation. The FBI's Boston office kept the bishop under investigation for more than a decade with no final outcome to the probe.

In 1945, Fan S. Noli received a doctor's degree (Ph.D.) in history from Boston University, writing a dissertation on Skanderbeg. In the meantime, he also conducted research at Boston University Music Department, publishing a biography on Ludwig van Beethoven. He also composed a one-movement symphony called Scanderbeg in 1947. Toward the end of his life, Noli retired to Fort Lauderdale, Florida, where he died in 1965. 

Fan Noli is interred in Forest Hills Cemetery, situated in the southern part of Boston's Jamaica Plain neighborhood.

The Albanian Orthodox Archdiocese in America founded by Noli went on to join the Orthodox Church in America, today led by Metropolitan Tikhon Mollard as the Albanian Archdiocese. Until recently overseen by Archbishop Nikon of Boston and the Very Reverend Arthur E. Liolin, the Albanian Archdiocese of the Orthodox Church in America is currently headed by Interim Chancellor Igumen Nikodhim Preston. It consists of eleven urban and suburban parishes situated primarily in the urban centers of the Northeastern United States and the Midwestern United States. The Autocephalous Orthodox Church of Albania, which Noli served in Albania, is presided over by Archbishop Anastasios of Albania, headquartered in the Albanian capital city of Tirana and a member of the World Council of Churches. In addition, the Greek Orthodox Archdiocese of America administers two Albanian Orthodox parishes in Boston and Chicago. All Albanian Orthodox parishes are today in full communion with one another and with the broader worldwide body of the Orthodox Church and fully recognized by the Ecumenical Patriarchate of Constantinople.

Writing in his diary two days after Noli's death, Albanian leader Enver Hoxha gave his analysis of Noli's work:

Fan S. Noli is depicted on the obverse of the Albanian 100 lekë banknote issued in 1996. It remained in use until 2008 when it was replaced by a coin.

Poems
The following poems were written by Fan Noli:

 Hymni i Flamurit 
 Thomsoni dhe Kuçedra
 Jepni për Nënën 
 Moisiu në mal
 Marshi i Krishtit 
 Krishti me kamçikun 
 Shën Pjetrin në Mangall 
 Marshi i Barabbajt 
 Marshi i Kryqësmit 
 Kirenari 
 Kryqësmi 
 Kënga e Salep-Sulltanit 
 Syrgjyn-vdekur
 Shpell' e Dragobisë 
 Rent, or Marathonomak! 
 Anës lumejve
 Plak, topall dhe ashik 
 Sofokliu 
 Tallja përpara Kryqit 
 Sulltani dhe kabineti 
 Saga e Sermajesë 
 Lidhje e paçkëputur 
 Çepelitja 
 Vdekja e Sulltanit

See also
History of Albania
Religion in Albania
Solomon Goldstein

References

Citations

Sources

Further reading

George Castriota Scanderbeg, by Fan Noli
Beethoven and the French Revolution by Noli, Fan Stylian

External links

1882 births
1965 deaths
20th-century Eastern Orthodox bishops
Albanians from the Ottoman Empire
Eastern Orthodox Christians from Albania
American people of Albanian descent
Primates of the Albanian Orthodox Church
Government ministers of Albania
Prime Ministers of Albania
Albanian revolutionaries
English–Albanian translators
20th-century Albanian historians
Harvard University alumni
Albanian expatriates in Ukraine
Albanian emigrants to the United States
People from İbriktepe
Albanian diplomats
20th-century translators
20th-century Albanian politicians
Translators of the Bible into English
Albanian expatriates in Egypt
Spanish–Albanian translators
Albanian expatriates in Austria
Albanian male poets
19th-century male writers
20th-century male writers